Dan Riisnes (born 20 May 1965) is a Norwegian former football goalkeeper, which has worked as goalkeeper coach at Brann since 1999.

Player career
Riisnes made his debut for Brann as an 18-year-old, when both Stein Norstad and Geir André Johannessen was unavailable for play. In total, he played 40 matches for Brann from 1983 to 1989.

Coaching career
Riisnes have since 1999 been goalkeeper coach at Brann and Norwegian youth international teams.

On a couple of occasions inn 2007 and 2008 he was on Brann's bench as their goalkeeper-reserve on the first team.

References

1965 births
Living people
Footballers from Bergen
Norwegian footballers
Association football goalkeepers
SK Brann players
Eliteserien players